The canton of Miribel is an administrative division in eastern France. At the French canton reorganisation which came into effect in March 2015, the canton was expanded from 5 to 8 communes:
Beynost
La Boisse
Miribel
Neyron
Niévroz
Saint-Maurice-de-Beynost
Thil 
Tramoyes

Demographics

See also
Cantons of the Ain department 
Communes of France

References

Cantons of Ain